The Fawbush-Miller Award is a US Air Force award given for the most Outstanding Operational Weather Squadron for the entire Air Force. It is named after Robert C. Miller and E J. Fawbush, who pioneered forecasting tornadoes.

See also
 List of meteorology awards

External links
AWA & AFW ANNUAL AWARDS

Fawbush-Miller
Fawbush-Miller